Carol Roberts (née Adamson) (born 3 February 1964) is a former association football player who represented New Zealand at international level.

Roberts made her Football Ferns début in a 3–0 win over Switzerland on 8 December 1984, and finished her international career with seven caps and one goal to her credit.

References

1964 births
Living people
New Zealand women's international footballers
New Zealand women's association footballers
Women's association footballers not categorized by position